Karolina Konieczna is a road cyclist from Poland. She represented her nation at the 2006 UCI Road World Championships.

References

External links
 profile at Procyclingstats.com

Polish female cyclists
Living people
Place of birth missing (living people)
Year of birth missing (living people)